

References

Con
Battles involving Bolivia
Battles involving Chile
Battles involving Peru
Yungay, battle formations at
History of Ancash Region